Arthur Charles Hagan (March 17, 1863 – March 25, 1936) was an American Major League Baseball player who pitched for two seasons; Philadelphia Quakers of the National League in , and with the Buffalo Bisons in both 1883 and .

On August 21, 1883, when the Quakers traveled to Providence, Rhode Island to play the Providence Grays, Manager Bob Ferguson, needed to increase ticket sales on the road because the American Association entry in Philadelphia had forced the Quakers to reduce prices to 25 cents a game. He gave the starting pitcher duties to Art, who was a Rhode Island native, with the idea the appearance of Hagen would draw the locals. The strategy worked as the fans came in large numbers. However, Hagen surrendered 28 runs and the Quakers made 20 errors behind him, as Philadelphia lost in the most lopsided shutout in major league history, 28–0. Charles "Old Hoss" Radbourn was the winning pitcher.

Art died at the age of 73 in his hometown of Providence, and is interred at St. Ann Cemetery in Cranston, Rhode Island.

References

External links

1863 births
1936 deaths
Baseball players from Providence, Rhode Island
Major League Baseball pitchers
19th-century baseball players
Philadelphia Quakers players
Buffalo Bisons (NL) players
Waterbury (minor league baseball) players